Flour Bluff is a specified area of the city of Corpus Christi, Texas.  It is located on Encinal peninsula bordered by Corpus Christi Bay on the north, Oso Bay on the west, the Laguna Madre on the east and the King Ranch to the south.  South Padre Island Drive crosses Flour Bluff, dividing it into an upper part, commonly known as North Bluff, (mostly occupied by Corpus Christi Naval Air Station), and a lower part, commonly known as South Bluff. The area is mostly made up of suburban development, with a population consisting mostly of lower-middle income families, with local and national businesses such as Walmart, H-E-B grocery stores, etc.

History
Flour Bluff, at the tip of Corpus Christi Bay, received its name from an incident in the pastry war between France and Mexico. The pastry war began in 1838 because Mexico had refused to pay some debts to the French People who were living in Mexico. One of the men asking for repayment was a French baker whose bakery shop had been robbed by Mexican soldiers during a celebration of some kind. The French government wanted Mexico to pay the expenses for the robbery. The Mexican government refused to pay the French so the French sent a fleet of ships off the coast of Veracruz, Mexico and declared a blockade of all Mexican ports from the Yucatan to the Rio Grande. Therefore, trade between Mexico and the rest of the world was stopped. Merchandise to be sent to Mexico was dropped at the port and then transported to the Rio Grande. During the war, Texas became afraid that France would try to close the Texas ports due to the smuggling. A Texas militia was sent to Corpus Christi Bay to put a stop to all smuggling into Mexico. At this time, the Mexicans made an unexpected visit to the Bay of Corpus Christi and dropped about a hundred barrels of flour upon the beach. Thus, the name “Flour Bluff” came into existence.

Overview 
What is now Flour Bluff Drive was once a railroad branch going off Texas Mexican Railway to the Naval Air Station.  Waldron Field, located on the south side of Flour Bluff, was built during World War II and since then has been used as a Navy landing airfield. One can commonly see the orange and white training planes flying around the area. Of historical interest: President George H. W. Bush was relocated at the Navy base for training classes in 1942. One of the numerous airplane crashes of future senator John McCain was at this Navy base.

According to the Historical Marker located on SH 358 eastbound, near Laguna Shores Road, just west of the JFK Memorial causeway,
in the spring of 1838 France blockaded the coast of Mexico during the Pastry War, so-called because the casus belli of the war being a French pastry chef seeking reparations for his destroyed pastry shop, allegedly by Mexican officers. The strategic location of Corpus Christi Bay led to the revival of smuggling in this area. Supplies were carried overland across the Rio Grande, and the illicit trade flourished as Mexico bought sorely needed goods in Texas. President Sam Houston did not wish to antagonize Mexico.  However, Mexican patrols at Corpus Christi offended many Texans. In July, 1838, authorities in Texana, Texas heard reports of Mexican activity near the bay. A captured Mexican sea captain said that his government had declared Corpus Christi a port of entry and had dispatched about 400 men to protect it. A summons was issued, calling Texans to rally at Texana on August 7 to drive the Mexicans from the Republic's boundaries. By the time the volunteers reached the area, some of the Mexicans had landed their supplies near the tip of Corpus Christi Bay and returned to Matamoros. The rest scattered, leaving behind about 100 barrels of flour and parts of a steam engine. The Texans confiscated the usable flour and other contraband, and the site became known as Flour Bluff.

Education
Flour Bluff is home to the Flour Bluff Independent School District.  Six campuses and athletic facilities are located on a single 170-acre site which supports 5,600 students in prekindergarten through 12th grades.

Flour Bluff High School came under fire in 2011 in a scandal that received national attention, due to the district's initial refusal to allow students to form a GSA (Gay-Straight Alliance) on campus, despite allowing FCA (Fellowship of Christian Athletes) factions in their high school and junior high. (FBISD initially denied the formation of the GSA due to the fact that it was a 'non-curricular' club. When it was pointed out that the FCA and other clubs were also non-curricular, and still allowed to meet on campus, all clubs were briefly suspended. Due to parent and student outrage, several clubs were reinstated.) This refusal was found to contradict the First Amendment, as well as the Equal Access Act.

In Spring 2011, a petition was circulated to allow the formation of the GSA. The ACLU (American Civil Liberties Union) sent a letter to Superintendent Carbajal on March 2, 2011, requesting the formation of the club be allowed.

It was eventually decided that the GSA be allowed to form, and meet on campus.

Recreation
Flour Bluff is bordered on the East by the Laguna Madre, renowned for its fine Red Drum, (or Redfish) and Trout fishing. The Boat Hole, accessed from the North Bluff is an area between the Naval Air Station on the west and Dimmit's Island on the east; Corpus Christi Bay to the north and the Boat Hole flats (immediately north of the JFK Causeway) to the south provides excellent fishing. Deeper draft boats come in from the bay, while shallower boats can use the channel that parallels Flour Bluff to the north of the JFK causeway.

One of Flour Bluff's many parks, Waldron Park, is also the site of a 9-hole disc golf course.

References

See also 
 Corpus Christi, Texas
 Flour Bluff Independent School District
 Corpus Christi Naval Air Station

Geography of Corpus Christi, Texas